Nebulosa rabae is a moth of the family Notodontidae. It is found in cloud forests on the eastern slope of the Ecuadorian Andes, in the Napo Province.

The length of the forewings is 12.5–14 mm for males and 13–14 mm for females. Adults have a mustard-yellow wing color with intricate forewing markings. The hindwings are rich creamy white to mustard yellow.

Etymology
The species is named in honor of Suzanne Rab Green, an expert on Arctiidae.

References

Moths described in 2008
Notodontidae of South America